Breidbach is a neighborhood in King William's Town in South Africa, situated in the Border region of the Eastern Cape province.

Breidbach was originally established in 1857 as a settlement for members of the British German Legion. The population today consists mostly of Coloureds. The area boasts a rich culture of sports enthusiasts (mainly cricket, rugby and soccer) and church-goers.

Breidbach has two schools, a primary school and secondary school, both are double-medium (co-ed). The attractions are: night clubs, sports field, clinic, library, community (civic) centre, butchery and churches.

The Yellowwoods waterfalls in the Yellowwoods River, a tributary of the [Buffalo River (Eastern Cape)|Buffalo River], is to be found near the town.

References

Populated places in Buffalo City Metropolitan Municipality
Populated places established in 1857
German settlements in South Africa
1857 establishments in the Cape Colony